The 2003 Players Championship was a golf tournament in Florida on the PGA Tour, held  at TPC Sawgrass in Ponte Vedra Beach, southeast of Jacksonville. It was the 30th Players Championship. 

Davis Love III shot a final round 64 in cool and blustery conditions to handily win his second Players title, six strokes ahead of runners-up Jay Haas and Pádraig Harrington, the 54-hole co-leaders. Love won eleven years earlier in 1992, and started the final round two strokes back.

Defending champion Craig Perks finished twelve strokes back, in a tie for seventeenth place.

Venue

Field
Fulton Allem, Robert Allenby, Stephen Ames, Billy Andrade, Stuart Appleby, Paul Azinger, Briny Baird, Craig Barlow, Pat Bates, Cameron Beckman, Rich Beem, Notah Begay III, David Berganio Jr., Mark Brooks, Olin Browne, Bob Burns, Jonathan Byrd, Tom Byrum, Ángel Cabrera, Mark Calcavecchia, Chad Campbell, Michael Campbell, Jim Carter, Greg Chalmers, K. J. Choi, Stewart Cink, Tim Clark, Darren Clarke, José Cóceres, John Cook, Fred Couples, Ben Crane, John Daly, Robert Damron, Glen Day, Chris DiMarco, Luke Donald, Joe Durant, David Duval, Joel Edwards, Steve Elkington, Bob Estes, Nick Faldo, Niclas Fasth, Brad Faxon, Steve Flesch, Dan Forsman, Carlos Franco, Harrison Frazar, Fred Funk, Jim Furyk, Robert Gamez, Sergio García, Brian Gay, Brent Geiberger, Matt Gogel, Retief Goosen, David Gossett, Jay Haas, Pádraig Harrington, Dudley Hart, J. P. Hayes, J. J. Henry, Tim Herron, Glen Hnatiuk, Charles Howell III, John Huston, Trevor Immelman, Lee Janzen, Brandt Jobe, Per-Ulrik Johansson, Steve Jones, Jonathan Kaye, Jerry Kelly, Skip Kendall, Matt Kuchar, Neal Lancaster, Bernhard Langer, Paul Lawrie, Stephen Leaney, Tom Lehman, Justin Leonard, Thomas Levet, J. L. Lewis, Frank Lickliter, Peter Lonard, Davis Love III, Steve Lowery, Andrew Magee, Jeff Maggert, Shigeki Maruyama, Len Mattiace, Billy Mayfair, Scott McCarron, Spike McRoy, Rocco Mediate, Shaun Micheel, Colin Montgomerie, Greg Norman, Mark O'Meara, Geoff Ogilvy, José María Olazábal, Rod Pampling, Jesper Parnevik, Craig Parry, Carl Paulson, Corey Pavin, David Peoples, Pat Perez, Craig Perks, Tom Pernice Jr., Kenny Perry, Tim Petrovic, Nick Price, Chris Riley, Loren Roberts, John Rollins, Eduardo Romero, Justin Rose, Rory Sabbatini, Gene Sauers, Adam Scott, John Senden, Joey Sindelar, Vijay Singh, Heath Slocum, Jeff Sluman, Chris Smith, Paul Stankowski, Steve Stricker, Kevin Sutherland, Hal Sutton, Hidemichi Tanaka, Phil Tataurangi, Esteban Toledo, David Toms, Kirk Triplett, Bob Tway, Scott Verplank, Duffy Waldorf, Mike Weir, Jay Williamson, Garrett Willis, Tiger Woods

Round summaries

First round
Thursday, March 27, 2003
Friday, March 28, 2003

Second round
Friday, March 28, 2003
Saturday, March 29, 2003

Source:

Third round
Saturday, March 29, 2003

Source:

Final round
Sunday, March 30, 2003

References

External links
The Players Championship website
Full Leaderboard

2003
2003 in golf
2003 in American sports
2003 in sports in Florida
March 2003 sports events in the United States